"Distant Sun"  is a song by Australian band Crowded House. It was the first single released from the group's fourth studio album, Together Alone (1993). The song gave the band another top-20 hit in the United Kingdom, peaking at number 19, but fell shy of the mark in Australia at number 23. It was also a top-five hit in Canada and New Zealand, reaching numbers four and five, respectively. In March 1994, a remixed version of "Distant Sun" was released in the United States, reaching number 26 on the Billboard Modern Rock Tracks chart. The regular mix was not released as a single in the US and was only available on the album.

In 2005, a tribute album was created featuring a collection of Neil and Tim Finn's songs reinterpreted by female singers as the album She Will Have Her Way. "Distant Sun" was performed by multi-platinum New Zealand artist Brooke Fraser. Fraser's version was mostly similar to the original version, but the key was changed to suit her voice and she omitted the line "Like a Christian fearing vengeance from above" as she is a Christian, and herself fears said vengeance.

A live version of the song was included on the single for "Locked Out," a song also from Together Alone. This version was recorded at Hammersmith Apollo, England on 12 November 1993.

Track listings
As the lead single from Together Alone, "Distant Sun" was released in various versions internationally. All songs, including B-sides, were written by Neil Finn unless otherwise noted.

UK CD single

All live tracks were recorded at The Roxy, Los Angeles, 26 February 1987. "Distant Sun" and "Walking on the Spot" are from the Together Alone album.

Disc one
 "Distant Sun" – 3:51
 "This Is Massive"  – 3:55 (live)
 "When You Come" – 6:16 (live)

Disc two
 "Distant Sun" – 3:51
 "Walking on the Spot" – 2:54
 "Throw Your Arms Around Me"  – 3:54 (live)
 "One Step Ahead" – 3:52 (live)

Holland CD single
 "Distant Sun"
 "Don't Dream It's Over" (live at the King Biscuit Flower Hour, 24 March 1987)

Netherlands CD single

All B-sides recorded live at The Roxy, Los Angeles, 26 February 1987 except "Walking on the Spot" which is the Together Alone album version.
 "Distant Sun" – 3:51
 "Walking on the Spot" – 2:54
 "Throw Your Arms Around Me"  – 3:54 (live)
 "One Step Ahead" – 3:52 (live)

Australian CD single

All live tracks were recorded at The Town & Country Club, London on 9 and 10 November 1991.
 "Distant Sun" – 3:50
 "Walking on the Spot" (live) – 2:55
 "When You Come" (live) – 6:23
 "Skin Feeling"  – 3:56
 "Weather with You" (live) – 5:26

US CD single

Live tracks were recorded at Munich, Germany, 12 December 1993.
 "Distant Sun" (remix version) – 3:45
 "Pineapple Head" – 3:54 (live)
 "Locked Out" – 3:38 (live)

Charts

Weekly charts

Year-end charts

References

Crowded House songs
1993 singles
1993 songs
APRA Award winners
Brooke Fraser songs
Capitol Records singles
Songs written by Neil Finn